Peng Mingzhi (6 April 1905 – 10 May 1993) was a People's Liberation Army lieutenant general and Chinese diplomat. He was born in Changning, Hunan. He was the first Ambassador of the People's Republic of China to Poland (1950–1952). He was commander of the People's Liberation Army's Hebei Military District (1952–1957).

1905 births
1993 deaths
People's Liberation Army generals from Hunan
Ambassadors of China to Poland
People from Changning, Hunan